This is a list of broadcast television stations that are licensed in the U.S. state of Nevada.

Full-power stations
VC refers to the station's PSIP virtual channel. RF refers to the station's physical RF channel.

Defunct full-power stations
Channel 7: KEGS - Ind. - Goldfield (4/?/2002-6/12/2009)
Channel 7: KWNV - satellite of KRNV - Winnemucca (1998-7/1/2008)
Channel 10: KEKO - satellite of KTVN - Elko (4/18/1973–12/1975)

LPTV stations

Defunct low-power stations
Channel 25: KTUD-CD - Las Vegas - UPN/Ind.
Channel 30: KEGS-LP - Las Vegas - satellite of KEGS (2002–2009)

Translators

Local cable channels (Las Vegas Area)
Channel 2: KCLV - City of Las Vegas
Channel 4: CCTV - Clark County also available as streaming video
Channel 19: Las Vegas One, a joint project between Cox Cable, KLAS-TV and The Greenspun Corporation (Ceased Operation)
Channel 3: KLBC - tv2KLBC 

Nevada
 
Television stations